Ronald Cecil Hamlyn McKie (11 December 1909 – 8 May 1991) was an Australian novelist. He was born on 11 May 1909 in Toowoomba, Queensland. After receiving his education at the Brisbane Grammar School and the University of Queensland, he worked as a journalist on newspapers in Melbourne, Sydney, Singapore, and China. He served in the AIF during World War II from 1942–1943, following which he served as war correspondent for several Australian and UK newspapers. After the war he worked for the Sydney Daily Telegraph. McKie died from kidney disease on 8 May 1991 in Canterbury, Melbourne, Australia.

Awards 

 Miles Franklin Award, 1974, and FAW Barbara Ramsden Award (joint winner 1974) for The Mango Tree.

Bibliography 
The Australian Dictionary of Biography references a biography and cites other references.

Novels

 The Mango Tree (1974)
 The Crushing (1977)
 Bitter Bread (1978)

Autobiography

 Bali (1969)
 We Have No Dreaming (1988)

Non-fiction
 This Was Singapore (1947)
 Proud Echo (1953)
 The Survivors (1953)
 The Heroes (1960)
 The Emergence of Malaysia (1963)
 Malaysia in Focus (1964)
 The Company of Animals (1966)
 Singapore (1972)
 Echoes from Forgotten Wars (1980)

References 

1909 births
1991 deaths
Australian non-fiction writers
Miles Franklin Award winners
People from Toowoomba
Writers from Queensland
20th-century Australian novelists
Australian male novelists
Male non-fiction writers